Warm and Cozy is a 2015 South Korean television series starring Kang So-ra and Yoo Yeon-seok. Written by the Hong sisters as a twist on the fable of The Ant and the Grasshopper, it aired on MBC from May 13 to July 2, 2015 on Wednesdays and Thursdays at 22:00 for 16 episodes.

Plot
Lee Jung-joo has struggled and worked hard all her life, but has never caught a break, leaving her perpetually grouchy. In her seven years as an administrative employee at a clothing company in Seoul, she has never missed a day of work. But that doesn't stop her from losing her job, her house and her boyfriend in quick succession, so she unwillingly sets off to start a new life in Jeju Island.

There, she meets Baek Gun-woo, chef and owner of the restaurant "Warm and Cozy.". Jung-joo met Baek Gun-woo previously during their nineteenth birthday and mistaken that they are twin. Jung-joo first mistakes him for a con artist, because he can't seem to help himself from telling charming lies left and right. Gun-woo is a laidback romantic from a wealthy family who only does what he feels like doing, including opening a restaurant on Jeju simply because that's where he first met his first crush. Jung-joo and Gun-woo clash over their different personalities and priorities, then gradually fall in love with each other.

Cast

Main
Kang So-ra as Lee Jung-joo
29 years old. She was working 7 years in underwear company in Seoul. When she lost her job, boyfriend and apartment, she moved to Sorang Town on Jeju island to start new life. 
Yoo Yeon-seok as Baek Gun-woo
29 years old. Youngest child of wealthy family. His siblings have different fathers and he is supported by older brother. He opened restaurant "Warm and Cozy" in Sorang Town to impress his first love. Talented chef, but lazy, working only for fun.

Supporting
Jung Jin-young as Jung Poong-san, Gun-woo's friend working with him im "Warm and Cozy" restaurant
Kim Sung-oh as Hwang Wook, mayor of Sorang Town, bachelor
Seo Yi-an as Mok Ji-won, Gun-woo's first love
Lee Sung-jae as Song Jung-geun, Gun-woo's older brother, president of Noblesse Resort
Kim Hee-jung as Kim Hae-shil, haenyeo, president of Sorang Haenyeo Assoctiaton 
Lee Han-wi as Gong Jong-bae, man of many trades in Sorang Town
Ok Ji-young as Cha Hee-ra, Gun-woo's older sister, director of entertainment agency
Kim Mi-jin as Bu Mi-ra, writer living on Jeju.
Lee Yong-yi as Noh Bok-nyeo, haenyeo of Sorang Town
Gu Bon-im as Go Yoo-ja, haenyeo of Sorang Town
Choi Sung-min as Park Dong-soo, Bu Mi-ra's husband
Lee Sang-hyun as Assistant Jang, Song Jung-geun's personal assistant
Choi Jae-sung as Jin Tae-yong, Gun-woo's father

Special appearance
Lee Hwi-hyang as Baek Se-young, Gun-woo's mother (ep. 1)
Lee Joong-moon as Hong Gap, Jung-joo's ex-boyfriend (ep. 1)
Na Seung-ho as public official
Go Kyung-pyo as Jung-min, Jung-joo's younger brother (ep. 1-2)
Kim Won-hyo as Gyeongsang groom at the airport (ep. 1)
Shim Jin-hwa as Seoul bride at the airport (ep. 1)
Kim Kwang-kyu, as Mr Gong (ep. 1)
So Ji-sub as Jeju restaurant owner (ep. 1)
Muzie as Rooftop neighbor (ep. 1-2)
Sam Okyere as Sam, a foreigner who joins the diving school on the island along with Jung-joo (ep. 5-9)
Nam Hyeon-joo as Jung-joo's mother (ep. 11)
Seohyun as Hwang Yura, Hwang Wook's niece (ep. 13)
Son Ho-jun as Son Joon-hee, Gun-woo's friend (ep. 16)

Ratings 
 In the table below,  represent the lowest ratings and  represent the highest ratings.
NR denotes that the drama did not rank in the top 20 daily programs on that date.

Original soundtrack

References

External links
Warm and Cozy official MBC website 
Warm and Cozy at MBC Global Media

2015 South Korean television series debuts
2015 South Korean television series endings
MBC TV television dramas
Korean-language television shows
South Korean romantic comedy television series
Television shows written by the Hong sisters
Fictional restaurants
Television series by Bon Factory Worldwide